Edward Exton Barclay JP (16 February 1860 – 4 March 1948) was an English gentleman and foxhunter.

Notes 
Barclay was the fourth son of (Joseph Gurney Barclay).  His brothers included  Francis Hubert Barclay, Henry Albert Barclay CVO.

He was educated at Trinity Hall, Cambridge (BA 1882, MA 1885)

He was a partner in Barclays Bank from 1886 to 1896. In Who's Who he listed his career as "Lord of the Manor" (of Brent Pelham Hall).

He was master of the Puckeridge Hounds from 1896, from 1910 jointly so with his son Maurice.   His Who's Who recreations were listed as "hunting, shooting, fishing".

He married Elizabeth Mary Fowler, daughter of the MP William Fowler, they had two sons (Geoffrey William Barclay MC (4 December 1891 – 28 July 1916 killed in action WW1) and the aforementioned Maurice Edward Barclay CBE (1886-1962)) and a daughter.  His first wife died in 1927.  In the same year he remarried Elizabeth Mary Fordham, widow of Harry Fordham, and daughter of the late Marlborough Pryor, of Weston Park.  His second wife was the elder sister of his daughter-in-law Margaret, wife of the twice aforementioned Maurice, and died in 1929.  Barclay himself died at Brent Pelham Hall on 4 March 1948.

References 

1860 births
1948 deaths
Alumni of Trinity Hall, Cambridge